Pakri is a village in West Champaran district in the Indian state of Bihar.

Demographics
As of 2011 India census, Pakri had a population of 4065 in 823 households. Males constitute 51.6% of the population and females 48.3%. Pakri has an average literacy rate of 46.1%, lower than the national average of 74%: male literacy is 61.5%, and female literacy is 38.4%. In Pakri, 21.1% of the population is under 6 years of age.

References

Villages in West Champaran district